The 1994 Legg Mason Tennis Classic was a men's tennis tournament played on outdoor hard courts at the William H.G. FitzGerald Tennis Center in Washington D.C., United States. It was the 26th edition of the tournament and was held from July 18 through July 24, 1994 and was part of the Championship Series of the 1994 ATP Tour. Second-seeded Stefan Edberg, who entered the tournament on a wildcard, won the singles title.

Finals

Singles
 Stefan Edberg defeated  Jason Stoltenberg 6–4, 6–2
 It was Edberg's 3rd singles title of the year and the 40th of his career.

Doubles
 Grant Connell /  Patrick Galbraith defeated  Jonas Björkman /  Jakob Hlasek 6–4, 4–6, 6–3

References

External links
 Official website
 ATP tournament profile

Legg Mason Tennis Classic
Washington Open (tennis)
1994 in sports in Washington, D.C.
1994 in American tennis